Air India Flight 403  was a scheduled Air India passenger flight that crashed at Sahar International Airport in Bombay, India on 21 June 1982. It was likely caused by miscalculated altitude in a heavy rainstorm.

Accident
On 21 June 1982, Air India Flight 403, a Boeing 707-437 (registered VT-DJJ) named Gauri Shankar, arriving from Kuala Lumpur International Airport via Madras (now Chennai), crashed after a hard landing during a rainstorm. The fuselage exploded after starting a late go-around. Of 111 occupants on the aircraft, 2 of 12 crew members and 15 of 99 passengers were killed.

Investigation
The Indian board of inquiry determined the probable cause of the crash to be "Deliberate reduction of engine power by the pilot 12 seconds prior to first impact due to altitude unawareness resulting in a high rate of descent, very heavy landing and the undershooting of the aircraft by 1300 feet."

References

Airliner accidents and incidents caused by pilot error
Aviation accidents and incidents in India
Aviation accidents and incidents in 1982
Accidents and incidents involving the Boeing 707
403
1982 in India
June 1982 events in Asia
History of Mumbai (1947–present)